Michele Anderson may refer to:
 Michele Anderson (convicted murderer), convicted of killing several family members in 2007
 Michele Anderson (criminologist)

See also
 Michelle Anderson (born 1967), American lawyer and scholar
 Michelle Anderson (tennis) (born 1972), South African tennis player